Ranunculus calandrinioides, the high alpine buttercup, is a species of flowering plant in the family Ranunculaceae, native to the Atlas Mountains of North Africa. It is one of the earliest buttercups to flower.

The specific epithet calandrinioides likens the plant to the distantly related genus Calandrinia.

In cultivation it requires gritty soil and a dormant period in summer. It may be grown in an alpine house. The plant has gained the Royal Horticultural Society's Award of Garden Merit.

References

calandrinioides
Flora of Africa
Alpine flora
Taxa named by Daniel Oliver